The 1941–42 İstanbul Football League season was the 34th season of the league. Beşiktaş JK won the league for the 6th time.

Season

References

Istanbul Football League seasons
Turkey
2